is an action-adventure game developed by Treasure and published by Sega for their Sega Genesis console in 1995. The game was included in the Sega Genesis Classics collections on Steam and other platforms in 2011. It was also included on the Sega Genesis Mini in North America and Sega Mega Drive Mini in PAL regions.

It is similar in gameplay to Landstalker, blending role-playing video game, action-adventure and platform video game elements in much the same way.

Gameplay 

The game is played from an isometric viewpoint. Players can move freely, jump, and push objects. They can execute simple sword slashes, use four magic elements in different combinations, and use items for various effects. Gameplay is a mix of action, puzzle solving, and platforming for the most part, with the usual role-playing staples like towns, shops, equipment, and spellcasting. The player controls Sir David as he travels through an assortment of dungeons, battling creatures such as "slime", solving puzzles to advance and saving those who were kidnapped. An auto-map feature keeps the focus on action and single-room puzzles, rather than mazes or labyrinths.

Plot 
Sir David is invited to visit Green Row after a recent journey. He has not been there for a long time and was eager to return. However, the king informs David that townspeople have been disappearing. The king asks him to search for the missing people. After finding a hidden stairway in the graveyard, he discovers a large dungeon of many floors underneath the town.

In the dungeon, as he begins to find the missing people, he gradually learns the story of an evil wizard named Ragno Roke, who was angered by the queen's rejection of his marriage proposal. As revenge, Lord Roke has planned to use the kidnapped townspeople as a sacrifice to reawaken the evil demon Ramiah, sealed long ago in the dungeon. As David descends, he passes through a town of goblins, and a guild of wizards who have been operating in the dungeon.

At the end of the game, David confronts both Roke and Ramiah. At this point the townspeople have been rescued, but Roke tells David that his own life would be sufficient to revive Ramiah and sacrifices himself, bringing Ramiah to life for a final battle with David. After a victory, David leaves on horseback.

Development and release 
Light Crusader was developed by Japanese studio Treasure as part of partnership with Sega to develop products for the latter's Genesis console. This four game deal also included Dynamite Headdy, Alien Soldier, and Yu Yu Hakusho Makyō Tōitsusen. Light Crusader was programmed by Kazuhiko Ishida with support from Keiji Fujitake and Treasure president Masato Maekawa. The game's graphics and art were provided by Hiroshi Iuchi, Makoto Ogino, Kaname Shindo, and Koichi Kimura. Katsuhiko Suzuki was the sound director while Aki Hata and Satoshi Murata composed the music and sound effects respectively.

The project was announced in the spring of 1994 under the working title Relayer. Iuchi revealed that in its earliest stages, Light Crusader was planned as an action version of the classic RPG series Wizardry. The staff sought to improve the operability and enjoyment of pseudo-3D graphics afforded by the isometric viewpoint, but this presented challenges. Ishida said that it was difficult to program multiple joints in 3D, while Iuchi claimed that the three-quarters perspective interfered with the performance of the Genesis. Development was delayed when the team started over from scratch at one point. Iuichi estimated that the final build of the game was only 30% complete by the end of 1994.

Light Crusader was Treasure's last title to appear on the Genesis console. Throughout 1995, Sega published the game in Japan, North America, Europe, and Australia while Samsung published it in South Korea. In the following decades, Light Crusader has been made available as both a stand-alone downloadable title and as part of several Genesis compilations. The game was released on the Wii Virtual Console in 2007; as part of the Sega Genesis Classics collection for Steam and home platforms beginning in 2011; on the North America Sega Genesis Mini and PAL region Sega Mega Drive Mini consoles in 2019; and finally on the Nintendo Switch Online + Expansion Pack in 2022.

Reception 

Mean Machines Sega praised the graphics and unique mixture of gameplay elements. They criticized that the game is often too easy and dull, and compared it unfavorably to Beyond Oasis (referred to by its European title, The Story of Thor) for longevity, but nonetheless gave it a very positive assessment, calling it "A superlative arcade adventure with great playability." The four reviewers of Electronic Gaming Monthly praised the graphics, but all but one of them gave the game an overall negative assessment, saying that the perspective severely hinders visibility, the combat is clunky, the lack of story makes the game less involving and creates difficulty figuring out where to go next, and there is too much of an emphasis on puzzles. Next Generation said that the game design reflected Treasure's experience with action games, but that the non-action elements such as the puzzles and storyline are overly shallow, and the isometric perspective creates control difficulties. They concluded, "Light Crusader is still one of the more exciting and graphically pleasing Genesis titles that has come out recently, but this is by no means a RPG."

GamePro commented that the graphics and music are impressive in parts, but that the game is less challenging and complex than most RPGs, and that the player character maneuvers poorly, "with nowhere near the range or fluidity of movement of Ali in Beyond Oasis." However, they concluded, "In the end, Light Crusader gets a passing grade because of some cool bosses and interesting puzzle challenges." Hobby Consolas commended the pseudo-3D isometric visuals, gameplay, presentation and sound, stating that "Light Crusader fills an important void in the Mega Drive's role-playing game's library; the one that goes from pure role to adventure and nothing else."

Notes

References

External links 
 Light Crusader at GameFAQs
 Light Crusader at Giant Bomb
 Light Crusader at MobyGames

1995 video games
Action-adventure games
Nintendo Switch Online games
Sega video games
Sega Genesis games
Single-player video games
Treasure (company) games
Video games scored by Aki Hata
Video games with isometric graphics
Virtual Console games
Windows games
Video games developed in Japan